Union Center is a small rural village in Meade County, South Dakota, United States. It is an unincorporated community, which was designated as part of the U.S. Census Bureau's Participant Statistical Areas Program on June 10, 2010. It was not counted separately during the 2000 Census, but is scheduled for inclusion in the 2010 Census. It has the post office which serves the area covered by ZIP code 57787, and three small businesses.

Union Center was founded in 1927 by the Farmers' Union as one of their first enterprises in South Dakota.

References

Unincorporated communities in Meade County, South Dakota
Rapid City, South Dakota metropolitan area
Unincorporated communities in South Dakota
Census-designated places in South Dakota
Census-designated places in Meade County, South Dakota
Populated places established in 1927
1927 establishments in South Dakota